Ben Yehuda or Ben-Yehuda is a Hebrew surname. 

Ben Yehuda may also refer to:

Ben Yehuda Street (Jerusalem), a major street in downtown Jerusalem, Israel
Ben Yehuda Street (Tel Aviv), a street in Tel Aviv, Israel

See also
Bani Isra'il (disambiguation)
B'nai Israel (disambiguation)
Bar Yehuda
Ben-Israel